Enns is a town in the Austrian state of Upper Austria on the river Enns, which forms the border with the state of Lower Austria.

Enns was one of the first places in Austria to receive town privileges. The town charter dates to 22 April 1212; the document is displayed at the local museum. The date is also depicted on the Town Tower, the landmark of Enns.

Geography 
Enns extends for 7.5 km from north to south and 8.6 km from west to east. Its total area is 34.3 km², of which 12.8% are covered with forest, and 64.1% are used for agriculture.

The municipality can be subdivided into the districts of  Einsiedl, Enghagen, Enghagen am Tabor, Enns, Ental, Erlengraben, Hiesendorf, Kottingrat, Kristein, Kronau, Lorch, Moos, Rabenberg and Volkersdorf.

History 

The first settlements in the area of the mouth of the Enns river to the Danube date back to 4,000 years ago. Celts settled the land around 400 BC. Their kingdom of Noricum was incorporated into the Roman Empire in 15 BC and was designated as a Roman province under the reign of Emperor Claudius in AD 45.

In the second and third century, the Roman camp of Lauriacum, in which up to 6,000 soldiers were stationed, was located on the site of modern Enns. The adjacent settlement (today: Lorch) received the privileges of a municipium in 212 from Emperor Caracalla. At that time about 30,000 people lived here. During the Diocletian Persecution of Christians, a commander of the Roman army, Saint Florian, died as a martyr at Lauriacum on 4 May 304, when he was drowned in the Enns river. Only nine years later, the Emperor Constantine I proclaimed religious tolerance with the Edict of Milan. About 370, an Early Christian basilica was built on the remains of a Jupiter temple and Lauriacum was the see of a bishop until 488. The present Basilica of St. Lawrence at Lorch was built in 1344 on the foundations of the old church 

About 900, the Enisiburg castle, later Ennsegg Palace, was built on the Georgenberg hill to serve as a protective fortress against Magyar invasions. The surrounding settlement prospered from the 12th century onwards, when Ottokar II, Margrave of Styria established a market here. In 1186 the Georgenberg Pact was signed, an inheritance contract between Ottokar IV, Duke of Styria, who lacked a male heir, and the Babenberg duke of Austria, Leopold V. Following the death of Ottokar IV in 1192, his Duchy of Styria — then significantly bigger than the contemporary state, reaching from present day Slovenia to Upper Austria — fell to the House of Babenberg. Thus, Enns became Austrian.

As Leopold VI, Duke of Austria, endowed Enns with town privileges in 1212, it is now considered Austria's oldest town (apart from the Roman municipal status). The landmark of Enns, the belfry (Town Tower) on the Main Square, was erected between 1564 and 1568 as a bell tower, watch and clock tower during the reign of emperor Maximilian II.

Population

Politics

Municipal council

The municipal council consists of 37 members. Since the 2003 elections, party representation on the council has been as follows:
21 Social Democratic Party of Austria
12 Austrian People's Party
3 Austrian Green Party
1 Freedom Party of Austria

The current mayor is Christian Deleja-Hotko, a Social Democrat.

Population
In 1991, Enns had 10,192 inhabitants according to the census. The number grew to 10,639 in the census of 2001.

References

Cities and towns in Linz-Land District
Roman fortifications in Noricum
Roman towns and cities in Austria